Toshiko Takeya (竹谷とし子, Takeya Toshiko, married name 菊地とし子, Kikuchi Toshiko; born September 30, 1969) is Japanese Senator from Tokyo and a member of Kōmeitō ("Justice Party"). She received the second highest vote share (13.2%) in the 2010 Japanese Senate election in Tokyo and succeeded Yūji Sawa as Kōmeitō Senator from Tokyo who retired after one term.

A native of Shibetsu town, Hokkaidō, Takeya graduated from Sōka High School in Kodaira city, Tokyo and from Sōka University's Faculty of Economics in 1992. During her university studies, she passed the examination as Certified Public Accountant (kōnin kaikeishi) in 1991. After graduation, she began to work for Tōmatsu "LLC" (kansa hōjin, a business type for external auditors, regulated by Japanese CPA legislation). In 1996, she transferred to Tōmatsu spin-off ABeam Consulting "Ltd." (K.K.). Her work at ABeam included development projects in Indonesia and Vietnam.

As Yūji Sawa announced his retirement in order to not reach Kōmeitō's age limit of 66 while in office, Takeya decided to enter national politics in December 2009. Tokyo elects five Senators per election since 2007; in the 2010 election, popular Democratic administrative reform minister Renhō Murata garnered over 1.7 million votes, more than twice that of any other candidate. Takeya received 806,862 votes, about 20,000 less than Sawa six years before, but enough for second place as top elected Murata took more than a quarter of the Tokyo vote – Sawa had ranked fourth behind the major party candidates in 2004 –, and above Kōmeitō's target of 800,000 votes.

As of 2012, she is a member in the Committees on Financial Affairs (zaisei kin'yū), Oversight of Administration (gyōsei kansa) and the Special Committee on Official Development Assistance and Related Matters (seifu kaihatsu enjo nado ni kan suru tokubetsu-iinkai).

References 
 Profile on Toshiko Takeya's official website 
 Senate biography (Japanese, English)

Members of the House of Councillors (Japan)
New Komeito politicians
Living people
1969 births